Lawrence Weingarten (December 30, 1897 – February 5, 1975) was an American film producer. He was best known for working for Metro-Goldwyn-Mayer and producing some of the studio's most prestigious films such as Adam's Rib (1949), I'll Cry Tomorrow (1955) and Cat on a Hot Tin Roof (1958).

During his career, Weingarten was nominated for an Academy Award in 1959 and was given the Irving G. Thalberg Memorial Award in 1974, which was presented by Katharine Hepburn in her first and only appearance at the Oscars ceremony to present the award to her long time friend Weingarten. Whenever she won an Oscar, she always had either the presenter or another person associated with her film accept it on her behalf. Upon taking the stage, she received a standing ovation, to which she replied "I'm living proof that a person can wait forty-one years to be unselfish."

Early life and career
Weingarten was born in Chicago, Illinois on December 30, 1897. He began his career as a publicity man for Thomas H. Ince and First National Pictures. In 1921, he independently produced a series of Biblical films. He was also involved in the production of Buster Keaton comedies, as well as Marie Dressler and Polly Moran films early in his career.

Weingarten joined MGM under contract as an associate producer in 1927 and for many years was a co‐head of the MGM editorial board. During his almost forty year long tenure, he produced 75 films, including A Day at the Races (1937), Adam's Rib (1949), Pat and Mike (1952), The Tender Trap (1955), I'll Cry Tomorrow (1955), Don't Go Near the Water (1957) and Cat on a Hot Tin Roof (1958). In 1962, he served as a president of the Screen Producers Guild. He retired in 1968 and received the Irving G. Thalberg Memorial Award in 1974.

Personal life
Weingarten was married to Sylvia Thalberg from 1928 to 1939 and Jessie Marmorston from 1945 until his death.

Death
He died at the age of 77 on February 5, 1975, of leukemia. He was interred at the Hillside Memorial Park Cemetery.

Filmography as producer

The Broadway Melody (1929)
Sidewalks of New York (1931)
Sadie McKee (1934)
The Bishop Misbehaves (1935)
Rendezvous (1935)
Libeled Lady (1936) (Academy Award nomination)
A Day at the Races (1937) (uncredited)
I Take This Woman (1940)
I Love You Again (1940)
Adam's Rib (1949)
Invitation (1952)
Pat and Mike (1952)
The Actress (1953)
Rhapsody (1954)
The Tender Trap (1955)
I'll Cry Tomorrow (1955)
Don't Go Near the Water (1957)
Cat on a Hot Tin Roof (1958) (Academy Award and BAFTA nominations)
The Honeymoon Machine (1961)
 Period of Adjustment (1962)
The Unsinkable Molly Brown(1964)

References

External links
 

1897 births
1975 deaths
American Jews
American film producers
Film producers from Illinois
People from Chicago
Deaths from leukemia
Deaths from cancer in California